Akka Thangai is a 1969 Indian Tamil-language legal drama film, directed by M. A. Thirumugam and produced and screenplay by Sandow M. M. A. Chinnappa Thevar under his productions. The film dialogue was written by Aarudoss and the story was written by Poovai Krishnan respectively. Music was by Shankar–Ganesh. It stars Jaishankar, K. R. Vijaya, Sowcar Janaki, Major Sundarrajan and Nagesh playing lead roles. The film was remade in Telugu as Akka Chellelu (1970).

Plot 

Janaki, a woman, sacrifices everything to make her younger sister, Vijaya, an advocate. However, fate turns Vijaya against her sister's husband in a murder case.

Cast 
 Jaishankar as Shankar, an Engineer, younger brother of Judge Sundaram
 K. R. Vijaya as Vijaya, An Advocate, younger sister of Janaki
 Sowcar Janaki as Janaki, Vijaya's sister and Sundaram's wife
 Major Sundarrajan as Honest Judge Sundaram/Criminal Neruppu Kannaiyan
 Nagesh as Raju, Bhanumathi's brother
 M. Bhanumathi as Bhanumathi, Raju's sister and Raghavan's wife
 Pushpamala as Rani, Kuppusamy's daughter
 Prem Anand as Raghavan, Bhanumathi's husband
Senthamarai as Janaki & Vijaya's neighbour
Vellai Subbaiah as Rickshaw owner
T. K. S. Natarajan as Housekeeper
 Sandow M. M. A. Chinnappa Thevar as Inspector, guest appearance
 Vijaya Lalitha as Aasha, Neruppu Kannaiyyan's boss
 S. A. Ashokan as Public Prosecutor [Guest Appearance]
 Thengai Srinivasan as Kuppusamy [Guest Appearance]
 K. D. Santhanam as Judge, guest appearance

Soundtrack 
Music was by Shankar–Ganesh and lyrics were written by Kannadasan and A. Maruthakasi.

Accolades 
Akka Thangai won the Tamil Nadu State Film Award for Second Best Film.

References

External links 
 

1960s legal drama films
1960s Tamil-language films
1969 films
Films about brothers
Films about siblings
Films about sisters
Films directed by M. A. Thirumugam
Films scored by Shankar–Ganesh
Films shot in Chennai
Indian black-and-white films
Indian courtroom films
Indian feminist films
Indian legal drama films
Tamil films remade in other languages